The 1331 siege of Kasagi was among the first battles of the Genkō War, which brought an end to Japan's Kamakura period. Emperor Go-Daigo, who had been plotting against the shogunate and the Hōjō clan regents, had hidden the Japanese imperial regalia in Kasagi-dera, a fortified Buddhist temple, atop Kasagiyama, just outside Kyoto, and was secretly raising an army from there.

The temple was raided in the night by Hōjō forces under Suyama Yoshitaka and Komiyama Jirō, who climbed the cliffs surrounding the fortress, and set it aflame. The Emperor, however, escaped and fled.

The temple was rebuilt in 1381, and destroyed by fire again less than twenty years later. Today, only a few buildings remain.

References

Frederic, Louis (2002). "Japan Encyclopedia." Cambridge, Massachusetts: Harvard University Press.

Kasagi
Kasagi
1330s in Japan
1331 in Asia
Conflicts in 1331
Genkō War